IC socket may refer to:

DIP socket (aka DIL socket), a socket for ICs in dual-in-line package
ZIF socket, zero insertion force IC socket
CPU socket, an IC socket for processors